Augustine Kabaso Mulenga (born 17 January 1990) is a Zambian football player. He plays for Napsa Stars

Club career
In January 2018, Mulenga joined South African Premier Division club Orlando Pirates. He made his Premier Division debut on 3 March 2018, coming on as an 84th minute sub for Justin Shonga in a 3-1 home victory over Kaizer Chiefs. Mulenga scored his first competitive goal for the club on 4 April 2018 in a 2-1 league victory over Bloemfontein Celtic. His goal, assisted by Thembinkosi Lorch, was scored in the 77th minute.

International
He made his Zambia national football team debut on 26 March 2017 in a friendly game against Zimbabwe.

International goals
Scores and results list Zambia's goal tally first.

References

External links
 
 

1990 births
Living people
Sportspeople from Lusaka
Zambian footballers
Zambia international footballers
Nkwazi F.C. players
Nkana F.C. players
Zanaco F.C. players
Orlando Pirates F.C. players
AmaZulu F.C. players
Association football forwards
South African Premier Division players
Zambian expatriate footballers
Expatriate soccer players in South Africa
Zambian expatriate sportspeople in South Africa
Zambia Super League players
Zambia A' international footballers
2018 African Nations Championship players